Diary of a Hollow Horse is the fifth studio album by English new wave group China Crisis, released in 1989. It was released on CD, LP and Cassette. The original CD version features the bonus track "Back Home".

Described as ''perhaps their most Steely Dan-like album'', the first single released was ''St. Saviour Square'', originally recorded by Walter Becker and subsequently by Mike Thorne, whose version ended up on the album, despite the band considering the Walter Becker's version better.

The song lyrics refer to a demolished housing estate (now site of the Liverpool Women's Hospital) located in the square of the same name (now called Crown Street) west of Upper Parliament Street in the Toxteth area of Liverpool. Gary Daly recalls that: ''I would walk into town most days and hook up with everyone at rehearsals.The walk took me thru a relatively new housing estate, which had fallen prey to horrible neglect. I think with me just becoming a father for the first time shaped my thoughts and helped fashion the lyrics for St. Saviour Square”.The follow-up single would be ''Red Letter Day''. The album did not chart well in the UK given the lack of promotion by Virgin, which also shelved the video prepared for the first single. The album would be the last recorded by the band and distributed by Virgin.

A digitally remastered double-CD edition was published in May 2013 by Cherry Red Records, which includes the original and previously unreleased Walter Becker-produced versions of Red Letter Day, St. Saviour Square and All My Prayers.

Critical reception 

David Spodek, reviewer of RPM, expressed an opinion that "this release is proof enough that the choice of producer will certainly influence how an album will sound." As per him Walter Becker brings a lot of Steely Dan sound into the record, "and it makes for very smooth listening from beginning to end".

Track listing

Original version
All tracks written by Gary Daly, Gary Johnson, Eddie Lundon, Brian McNeill and Kevin Wilkinson

All tracks produced by Walter Becker, except 1, 6, 9 produced by Mike Thorne, and 2 produced by Walter Becker and China Crisis
"St. Saviour Square" – 4:09
"Stranger By Nature" – 3:56
"Sweet Charity in Adoration" – 4:51
"Day After Day" – 5:07
"Diary of a Hollow Horse" – 3:15
"Red Letter Day" – 4:38
"In Northern Skies" – 5:02
"Singing the Praises of Finer Things" – 5:20
"All My Prayers" – 4:04
"Age Old Need" – 3:21
"Back Home" – 3:54 (Only appears on the CD version)

2013 version
This version was issued in full consultation with Gary Daly of China Crisis and includes the original Walter Becker-produced tracks, band demo and live versions.

Disc A
"St. Saviour Square" (original Walter Becker production) – 5:27
"Stranger By Nature" – 4:04
"Sweet Charity in Adoration" – 4:53
"Day After Day" – 5:07
"Diary of a Hollow Horse" – 3:15
"Red Letter Day" (original Walter Becker production) – 5:24
"In Northern Skies" – 5:02
"Singing the Praises of Finer Things" – 5:20
"All My Prayers" (original Walter Becker production) – 4:04
"Age Old Need" – 3:21
"Back Home" – 3:54
"St. Saviour Square" (Extended 12" Mike Thorne Mix) 6:17
"Diary of a Hollow Horse" (acoustic version) 3:37
"All My Prayers" (Extended 12" Mike Thorne Mix) 6:10
"Red Letter Day" (Bazilington DJ Vibe Mix) 4:03

Stranger By Nature is listed in the CD booklet as "Uncompressed Version".

Disc B
"St. Saviour Square" (Mike Thorne Re-Recorded version) 4:09
"Red Letter Day" (Mike Thorne Re-Recorded version) 4:39
"All My Prayers" (Mike Thorne Re-Recorded version) 4:05
"St. Saviour Square" (Band demo) 6:25
"Stranger By Nature" (Band demo) 4:23
"In Northern Skies" (Band demo) 5:12
"Sweet Charity in Adoration" (Band demo) 4:49
"Diary of a Hollow Horse" (Band demo) 3:35
"Singing the Praises of Finer Things" (Band demo)  6:11
"All My Prayers" (Band demo)  5:29
"Red Letter Day" (Band demo) 6:01
"Age Old Need" (Band demo) 3:13
"St. Saviour Square" (Live version)  4:07
"All My Prayers" (Live version) 4:14

Personnel
China Crisis
Gary Daly – vocals
Eddie Lundon – acoustic & electric guitars, backing vocals
Brian McNeill – keyboards, backing vocals, marimba
Gary "Gazza" Johnson – bass
Kevin Wilkinson – drums, percussion, bouzouki
with:
Tim Weston - electric guitar
Robbie Buchanan - keyboards on "Day After Day", piano on "Singing the Praises of Finer Things"
Paulinho Da Costa - percussion on "Sweet Charity in Adoration"
Jim Horn - flute on "Sweet Charity in Adoration", saxophone on "Diary of a Hollow Horse"
Walter Becker - synthesizer on "Diary of a Hollow Horse"
Angie Jaree, Conrad Reeder, Linda Harmon, Maxine Waters, Myrna Matthews - backing vocals

References

1989 albums
China Crisis albums
Virgin Records albums
Albums produced by Mike Thorne
Albums produced by Walter Becker